Centre Pédagogique des Frères Unis is a Christian school (kindergarten, primary and secondary) in Haiti.
School colors are white and khaki.

History
The school was founded in 1988 by Fortune Cherfrère and Eugène Marcel, in Delmas 32 Port-au-Prince, Haiti. Now it is in Delmas 33 Port-au-Prince, with another campus in Gros-Morne, Artibonite, directed by Lessage Issalien.

External links
 http://www.facebook.com/CEPFU

Schools in Haiti
Christian schools in Haiti
Educational institutions established in 1988
1988 establishments in Haiti